Shriya Kishore is an Indian beauty queen. She was crowned as Pantaloons Femina Miss India Earth 2009 in Mumbai on 5 April 2009. She became a semifinalist in Miss Earth 2009.

Biography
Shriya was born on 12 May to Nirupama and Colonel Sanjay Kishore. She went to Lawrence School in Lovedale, Ooty.

Shriya had graduated with a bachelor's degree in Hotel Management (BHM) from the Welcomgroup Graduate School of Hotel Administration (WGHSA) at the Manipal University in Manipal, Karnataka, India in 2008. She joined WGSHA in 2004 as part of the 19th Course of the college.

Kishore has a younger brother, Divij Kishore, a corporate lawyer with a leading Mumbai law firm.

Femina Miss India 2009
Kishore won the Miss India Earth title at the Pantaloons Femina Miss India 2009 beauty pageant in Mumbai. Pantaloons Femina Miss India is a beauty pageant in India that selects its winners to compete in Miss Earth, Miss Universe, and Miss World. She won, along with Ekta Choudhary, who was crowned Miss India Universe 2009 and Pooja Chopra who was crowned Miss India World 2009. Kishore was crowned by Miss India Earth 2008 Tanvi Vyas.
 
Kishore was a wild card entry into the Pantaloons Femina Miss India 2009. She represented India at the Miss Earth 2009 in October.

Miss Earth 2009
Shriya performed well in the long gown competition and became a finalist from the Group - 2. She later entered the semifinals. However, she failed to make the cut as a finalist in the competition.

References

External links
 
 Miss India - Profile

Femina Miss India winners
Living people
Female models from Mumbai
1986 births
Manipal Academy of Higher Education alumni
Miss Earth 2009 contestants
Miss Earth India delegates